Scopula parvimacula is a moth of the  family Geometridae. It is found in New Guinea and Australia (Queensland).

The wingspan is about 40 mm. Adults are pale brown with arcs of green spots. The edges of the wings are scalloped.

Subspecies
Scopula parvimacula parvimacula
Scopula parvimacula erythroconia (Prout, 1938)
Scopula parvimacula kirwiriensis (Prout, 1938)
Scopula parvimacula papuana (Prout, 1938)
Scopula parvimacula privativa (Prout, 1917)

References

Moths described in 1896
parvimacula
Moths of Australia
Moths of New Guinea